Wilhelm Heinrich Wackenroder (13 July 1773 – 13 February 1798) was a German jurist and writer.  With Ludwig Tieck and the Schlegel brothers, he co-founded German Romanticism.

Life
Wackenroder was born in Berlin. He was a close friend of Tieck from youth until his early death.  They collaborated on virtually everything they wrote in this period. Wackenroder probably made substantial contributions to Tieck's novel Franz Sternbalds Wanderungen (Franz Sternbald’s Wanderings, 1798), and Tieck to Wackenroder's influential collection of essays, Herzensergießungen eines kunstliebenden Klosterbruders (Outpourings of an Art-Loving Friar, 1797).  Outpourings is a tribute to Renaissance and medieval literature and art, attributing to them a sense of emotion Wackenroder and Tieck felt was missing in German Enlightenment thought.  It was also the first work to claim for Northern Renaissance art a status equivalent to that of the Italian Renaissance, at least in the case of Albrecht Dürer. The Outpourings have been accorded a status in Germany akin to that of Lyrical Ballads in England, i.e. as the first work of the Romantic movement.

Wackenroder died in Berlin in 1798 at the age of 24 of a case of typhoid fever.

References

Bibliography 
 Robson-Scott, William Douglas. "Wackenroder and the Middle Ages." Modern Language Review 50.2 (1955): 156–167. online
 Scher, Steven Paul. "Temporality and Mediation: WH Wackenroder and ETA Hoffmann as Literary Historicists of Music." Journal of English and Germanic Philology 75.4 (1976): 492–502. online
 Spencer, Tom. "Revelation and Art Religion in WH Wackenroder and Ludwig Tieck." Monthly issues 107.1 (2015): 26–45. doi: 10.3368/m.107.1.26

 Kertz-Welzel, Alexandra. Die Transzendenz der Gefühle. Beziehungen zwischen Musik und Gefühl bei Wackenroder/Tieck und die Musikästhetik der Romantik. Saarbrücker Beiträge zur Literaturwissenschaft, no. 71. Ph.D. Dissertation (Saarbrücken, Germany: Universität des Saarlandes, 2000). St. Ingbert, Germany: Röhrig Universitätsverlag, 2001. .

External links
 German Romanticism, from the Literary Encyclopedia.
 Wackenroder's works at Projekt Gutenberg-DE.
 Wackenroders „Herzensergießungen eines kunstliebenden Klosterbruders“ in ihrem Verhältnis zu Vasari von Dr. Ernst Dessauer at Project Gutenberg
 
 

1773 births
1798 deaths
Writers from Berlin
Jurists from Berlin
People from the Margraviate of Brandenburg
University of Halle alumni
University of Erlangen-Nuremberg alumni
University of Göttingen alumni
18th-century German people
German male writers